Namarestaq is a Rural District in Mazandaran Province of Iran. It is situated in Amol County.

See also 
 Kelarestaq
 Kolijanrestaq

Geography of Mazandaran Province